Borun-e Bala (also Romanized as Borūn-e Bālā) is a village in Lisar Rural District, Kargan Rud District, Talesh County, Gilan Province, Iran. At the 2006 census, its population was 66, in 12 families.

References 

Populated places in Talesh County